When Men Betray refers to:

 When Men Betray (1918 film)
 When Men Betray (1929 film)